Betty Grundberg (née Meyer; February 16, 1938) is an American politician in the state of Iowa.

Grundberg was born in Woden, Iowa and attended Wartburg College and the University of Iowa. A Republican, she served in the Iowa House of Representatives from 1993 to 2003 (73rd district).

References

1938 births
Living people
People from Hancock County, Iowa
Businesspeople from Iowa
Women state legislators in Iowa
Republican Party members of the Iowa House of Representatives
20th-century American politicians
21st-century American politicians
Wartburg College alumni
University of Iowa alumni
20th-century American women politicians
21st-century American women politicians